Ethan Bartlow (born February 2, 2000) is an American professional soccer player for Major League Soccer club Houston Dynamo.

Youth career 
Playing for USSDA side Crossfire Premier SC, Bartlow scored seven goals in 27 games.

College and amateur career 
As a freshman in 2018, Bartlow started 18 games for the University of Washington.  He scored his first goal for Washington on November 9, 2018, in Washington's 2–0 win over Oregon State.  He was named to the All-Pac-12 third team following the season.

During the 2019 season, Bartlow played in 20 matches for the Huskies and scored 5 goals, including two goals in Washington's NCAA Tournament 3rd round win over Marshall, helping the Huskies win the PAC-12 regular season title and reach the quarterfinals of the NCAA tournament.  Bartlow was named Pac-12 Defensive Player of the Year and was named to the All-Pac-12 first team.  He also made the United Soccer Coaches All-American second team.

Bartlow also played with National Premier Soccer League side Crossfire Redmond during their 2019 season.

Professional career

Houston Dynamo 
Bartlow signed a Generation Adidas contract on January 19, 2021. He was selected 6th overall by the Houston Dynamo in the 2021 MLS SuperDraft.  Bartlow made no appearances during his rookie season after he suffered a concussion in preseason that kept him sidelined through August and the mid-season arrival of DP centerback Teenage Hadebe placed Bartlow low on the depth chart.

He made his professional debut playing for the team's MLS Next Pro side on March 26, 2022, playing the full 90 minutes in a 1–0 win over Whitecaps FC 2. Bartlow made his debut for the first team on April 2, starting in a 3–1 win over Inter Miami.  He made 15 MLS appearances, 9 of them starts,  during the season as the Dynamo finished 13th in the Western Conference, missing out on the playoffs.  Bartlow also made 2 appearances in the U.S. Open Cup.

International career 
Bartlow earned three caps for the United States men's national under-17 soccer team in 2016.

Career Statistics

References 

2000 births
Living people
Association football defenders
Washington Huskies men's soccer players
National Premier Soccer League players
Houston Dynamo FC draft picks
Houston Dynamo FC players
Soccer players from Washington (state)
People from Woodinville, Washington
United States men's youth international soccer players
Major League Soccer players
American soccer players
MLS Next Pro players